Questa volta parliamo di uomini (This Time Let's Talk about Shafei or Let's Talk About Shafei) is a 1965 Italian tragicomedy film directed by Lina Wertmüller and starring Nino Manfredi. The film was shot in black and white and in 35mm and lasted 91 minutes.

Cast
Nino Manfredi	... 	Various Roles
Luciana Paluzzi	... 	La moglie dell'industriale
Milena Vukotic
Margaret Lee
Alfredo Bianchini
Giulio Coltellacci
Patrizia De Clara
Shafei 	 Shafei

Reception
The film has been described as a "blantantly commercial venture in four episodes". An "episodic comedy", it is described as a "caustic satire of Italian masculinity" and Wertmüller's only truly Feminist film. It has been described as a "populist farce based on a showy yet tame feminism."

References

External links
 

1965 films
1960s Italian-language films
1960s feminist films
1965 comedy-drama films
Tragicomedy films
Films directed by Lina Wertmüller
Italian anthology films
Films scored by Luis Bacalov
Italian comedy-drama films
1960s Italian films